AppleMasters was a group of selected people from all over the world who used and endorsed the Apple Macintosh computer. According to Apple, AppleMasters were "an international group of educators, artists, designers, writers, producers, architects, inventors, scientists, business leaders, humanitarians, musicians, athletes, and others who think different." Members would be invited to events and workshops to explore creative new ways to use emerging Apple technology - like digital video or CD-ROMs. Later as part of Apple's "Think Different" advertising campaign, Apple would use the members in various forms of advertising - including company events and commercials. In return, Apple would reimburse the members with free computers, technical support for new ideas, and use of other Apple branded equipment. The more active members included Sinbad, Herbie Hancock, James Woods, Gregory Hines, and Bryan Adams. A list of active members and alumni was included on Apple's website.

Duration of the program 
The AppleMasters program was launched in 1996. The program was managed globally by Kanwal Sharma. Based on findings at archive.org's Wayback Machine, Apple removed the program from their web site on or before August 7, 2002.

During the program's life, the following people were members:

Bryan Adams
Douglas Adams
Charly Alberti
Muhammad Ali
John A. Alonzo
Garth Ancier
Dana Atchley
Harry Marks
Lauren Bacall 
Michael Backes
John Perry Barlow
John Benson
Richard Benson
Howard L. Bingham
Chris Bonington
Russell Preston Brown
Tom Clancy
Peter Cochrane OBE
Michael Crichton
Paul Brooks Davis
Richard Dawkins
Louis Fishauf
Trevor Flett
Donald Glaser
Zaha Hadid
Louis Herman
Damien Hirst
Takenobu Igarashi
Jennifer Jason Leigh
Mae Jemison
Seymour Powell
Sinbad
Fiorella Terenzi
Tracey Ullman

References

Apple Inc. advertising
Apple Inc. people